Lorena is a German, English, Croatian, Italian, Portuguese and Spanish feminine given name with different origins. It can be used as an version of Lorraine or, alternately, as a Latin version of Lauren. As a Croatian, Italian, Portuguese and Spanish name, it is derived from the Latin Laurentius. As a German and English name, it is a modern form of the Germanic Chlothar (which is a blended form of Hlūdaz and Harjaz). As used in the United States, it may have come from the song title of a popular 1856 song by Rev. Henry D.L. Webster and Joseph Philbrick Webster, who are said to have derived the name from an anagram of the name Lenore, a character in Edgar Allan Poe's 1845 poem The Raven. In Margaret Mitchell's 1936 novel Gone with the Wind, Scarlett O'Hara's daughter with Frank Kennedy was named Ella Lorena in reference to the song Lorena. Frank G. Slaughter wrote a book called Lorena in which the character was also called Reeny hence the alternative pronunciation of Lor ee na.

Given name

 Lorena Berdún (born 1963), Spanish sexologist
 Lorena Bernal (born 1977), Argentine model and former Miss Spain
 Lorena Blanco (born 1977), Peruvian badminton player
 Lorena Bobbitt (born 1970), former wife of John Wayne Bobbitt
 Lorena Briceño (born 1978), Argentine judoka
 Lorena Delgado Varas (born 1974), Swedish politician
 Lorena Feijóo  (born 1970 or 1971), Cuban ballet dancer
 Lorena Gale (1958–2009), Canadian actress
 Lorena (singer) (born 1986), Spanish singer, born Lorena Gómez Pérez
 Lorena Herrera (born 1967), Mexican actress
 Lorena Hickok (1893–1968), American journalist and friend (and possibly lover) of Eleanor Roosevelt
 Lorena Klijn (born 1987), Dutch kickboxer
 Lorena Kloosterboer (born 1962), Dutch Argentine artist and author
 Lorena Ochoa (born 1981), Mexican golfer
 Lorena Rojas (born 1972), Mexican actress and singer
 Lorena Velázquez (born 1937), Mexican actress
 Lorena Zaffalon (born 1981), Italian synchronised swimmer

Surname

 Liza Lorena (born 1949), Filipino actress

Fictional characters
 Lorena Krasiki, a fictional character in the Southern Vampire Mysteries series and True Blood television show
 Lorena Wood Parker, a fictional character in the Lonesome Dove series

Notes

Feminine given names
Croatian feminine given names
English feminine given names
German feminine given names
Italian feminine given names
Portuguese feminine given names
Spanish feminine given names